The boys' halfpipe competition of the snowboarding events at the 2012 Winter Youth Olympics in Innsbruck, Austria, was held January 15, at Kühtai. 27 athletes from 18 different countries took part in this event.

Results

Qualification
The qualification was started on 15 January at 09:30. The three best snowboarders from each heat qualified for the final (QF) and the six snowboarders from each heat qualified for the semifinal (QSF).

Semifinal
The semifinal was started on 15 January at 09:30. The six best snowboarderst qualified for the final (QF).

Final
The final was started on 15 January at 13:40.

References 

 

Snowboarding at the 2012 Winter Youth Olympics